Braian Ezequiel Mansilla (born 16 April 1997) is an Argentine professional footballer who plays as a central forward or winger for Russian club Orenburg, on loan from Racing Club.

Club career 
Mansilla came up through the youth ranks of Racing Club. He made his league debut on 19 October 2015 against Boca Juniors.

On 28 June 2021, he joined Platense on loan.

On 5 July 2022, Mansilla moved to Russian Premier League club Orenburg.

Career statistics

References

External links
 
 
 
 
 

1997 births
Footballers from Rosario, Santa Fe
Living people
Argentine footballers
Association football forwards
Racing Club de Avellaneda footballers
Quilmes Atlético Club footballers
Club de Gimnasia y Esgrima La Plata footballers
Vitória F.C. players
S.C. Farense players
Club Atlético Platense footballers
FC Orenburg players
Argentine Primera División players
Primeira Liga players
Russian Premier League players
Argentine expatriate footballers
Argentine expatriate sportspeople in Portugal
Expatriate footballers in Portugal
Argentine expatriate sportspeople in Russia
Expatriate footballers in Russia